Exutaspis megista is an extinct, "giant" buchanosteid arthrodire placoderm.  Its fossils have been found in the Late Emsian-aged marine strata of the Jiucheng and Haikou Formations in Wuding, Yunnan.

It was originally described as a phlyctaeniid. Later, after comparison with the Chinese Buchanosteus guanxianesis, Exutaspis was reappraised as a buchanosteid.

References

Buchanosteidae
Placoderms of Asia